Jowkan or Jovakan or Jookan or Jukan may refer to:
 Jowkan, Fars
 Jowkan, Bavanat, Fars Province
 Jowkan, Sistan and Baluchestan